This is a list of notable films produced by the Tollywood (Telugu language film industry) based in Hyderabad in the year 1988.

1988

1988
Telugu
Telugu films